Werner Müller (2 August 1920, in Berlin – 28 December 1998, in Cologne) was a German composer, Kapellmeister and conductor of Western classical music. In some of his works he collaborated with Caterina Valente and Horst Fischer, the trumpeter.

Discography (LP)

References

External links
Space Age Music maker

Easy listening musicians
Rundfunk im amerikanischen Sektor people
1920 births
1998 deaths
20th-century German musicians
20th-century German male musicians